The Ommexechidae are a family of grasshoppers, in the Orthoptera: suborder Caelifera. Species in this family can be found in the Americas.

Genera
The Orthoptera Species File lists:
 Aucacridinae Rehn, 1943
 Aucacris Hebard, 1929
 Conometopus Blanchard, 1851
 Cumainocloidus Bruner, 1913
 Neuquenina Rosas Costa, 1954
 Illapeliinae Carbonell & A. Mesa, 1972
 Illapelia Carbonell & Mesa, 1972
 Ommexechinae Bolívar, 1884
 Calcitrena Eades, 1961
 Clarazella Pictet & Saussure, 1887
 Descampsacris Ronderos, 1972
 Graea Philippi, 1863
 Ommexecha Serville, 1831
 Pachyossa Rehn, 1913
 Spathalium Bolívar, 1884
 Tetrixocephalus Gurney & Liebermann, 1963

References

External links
 
 
 
 

Caelifera
Orthoptera families